Dundalk Football Club is a professional association football club in Dundalk, Ireland. Dundalk compete in the League of Ireland Premier Division—the top tier of football in Ireland—and are the highest-ranked Irish side in European football as measured by UEFA club coefficients. They became the first club from outside Dublin to win the league title in 1932–33 and they won the FAI Cup for the first time in 1941–42. They won their most recent league title in 2019 and their most recent FAI Cup in 2020. They are the second most successful club in the League's history (with 14 league titles and 12 FAI Cups), and the most successful in the Premier Division era.

This list encompasses the major honours won by Dundalk, and the awards won by the club's players and managers. It also includes records set by the club and its players, and milestones the club has reached in its competitive history.

All season statistics are accurate as of the most recently completed season. All match and appearance statistics are accurate as of match played 6 November 2022.

Background

Current competitions
The League of Ireland was founded as a single-division 'A Championship' in 1921–22. It has comprised a Premier Division and First Division since the 1985–86 season. The winners of the Premier Division are the 'League Champions' and enter the qualification streams of the UEFA Champions League. The League runners-up and third place teams enter the qualification streams of the UEFA Europa Conference League.

The FAI Cup is a knock-out competition contested annually by clubs affiliated with the Football Association of Ireland, including non-League clubs. It was first run in the 1921–22 season. The winners of the FAI Cup are the 'Cup holders' and enter the qualification streams of the UEFA Europa Conference League. In the event of the winner of the FAI Cup also finishing in the top three in the League in the same season, the Europa Conference League qualifying place goes to the team placed fourth in the League.

The League of Ireland Cup was first run in the 1973–74 season to replace the League of Ireland Shield and the Dublin City Cup. It has had a number of formats but is currently a knock-out competition contested annually by League clubs and invited non-League clubs. As there is no European qualification for winners of the League Cup, it has a lower status than the FAI Cup and is therefore seen as the third most important trophy in the playing season.

The Leinster Senior Cup is a knock-out competition contested annually by clubs affiliated with the Leinster Football Association. It was first run in 1892–93 and is the oldest football cup competition in Ireland. It has been reduced in status over the years and was abandoned during the 2000–01 season, and not revived until 2010. It was again abandoned during the 2019–20 season because of the COVID-19 pandemic.

The President of Ireland's Cup is contested as a pre-season super cup between the winners of the previous season's League of Ireland Premier Division and the FAI Cup. It is organised by the FAI and was first run in 2014, replacing a similarly named tournament, the LFA President's Cup.

The Champions Cup (known as the Unite the Union Champions Cup for sponsorship purposes) is a cross-border association football competition inaugurated in 2019 in which the League of Ireland Premier Division champions from the Republic of Ireland face the NIFL Premiership champions from Northern Ireland. The Champions Cup is the successor to the Setanta Sports Cup.

Discontinued and junior competitions
The League of Ireland Shield was introduced when the League of Ireland started in 1921 and ran until the 1972–73 season. It was played in a variety of formats and was seen as the third most important trophy after the League and FAI Cup. The winners of the Shield gained entry to the following season's Inter-Cities Fairs Cup until that competition became defunct after 1970–71.

The Dublin City Cup ran from 1934–35 to 1972–73 (with two subsequent attempts to revive the competition). It was contested annually by all League clubs (not just those from Dublin) and had a number of formats. It was seen as the fourth most important trophy in the playing season.

The Top Four Cup was a super cup, which featured the clubs that finished in the four top positions in the League of Ireland, and was played at the end of the season. It ran between 1955–56 and 1973–74. The competition was sponsored by the Irish Independent newspaper, and as a result, was also known as the "Independent Cup".

The Dublin and Belfast Inter-City Cup ran from 1941–42 to 1948–49. It was a knock-out competition, contested annually by six clubs from each of the two jurisdictions in Ireland represented by the FAI and the Irish Football Association (IFA). It was the first official cross-border football tournament following the North/South split within the IFA in 1921.

The Setanta Sports Cup ran from 2005 to 2014. It was a knock-out competition, contested annually by clubs from each of the two jurisdictions in Ireland represented by the FAI and the IFA. It was the sixth cross border tournament following the Inter-City Cup, the North-South Cup (1961–62 to 1962–63), the Blaxnit Cup (1967–68 to 1973–74), the Texaco Cup (1973–74 to 1974–75), and the Tyler Cup (1978–1980). It was sponsored by the subscription television network, Setanta Sports.

The LFA President's Cup was a cup competition featuring League clubs affiliated to the Leinster Football Association. It was played for between 1930 and 2002. It was a de facto national super cup and on 24 occasions featured the League of Ireland champions against the FAI Cup winners. Since 2014, the FAI has organised their own similarly named super cup, the President's Cup.

The P.J. Casey Cup was a single-season competition run in 1962–63 to replace matches lost due to the reduction in teams that season. It ran as a two group, single match round-robin with the top two in each group then playing off in a semi-final and final. The competition was named in memory of P.J. Casey - a long time Honorary Treasurer of the League, and former committee member at Dundalk, who had died in late 1961. Drumcondra defeated Dundalk in the final.

The Leinster Junior Cup is a knock-out competition contested annually by junior clubs affiliated with the Leinster Football Association. It was first run in 1898–99. Dundalk G.N.R. were eligible to compete in the competition until they joined the Leinster Senior League in 1922–23.

The Dundalk and District League is a junior football league for the Dundalk district, which was first formed in 1905–06 then was re-established in 1919–20. The winners of the league are awarded the Macardle Cup, the trophy being originally sponsored by the Macardle Moore Brewery. Dundalk G.N.R. competed in the Dundalk and District League, before being promoted to the Leinster Senior League in 1922–23.

Honours

Source:

Trebles
League, FAI Cup, and Leinster Senior Cup: 1
2015
League, Shield, and Top Four Cup: 1
1966–67

Doubles
League and FAI Cup: 3
1978–79, 1987–88, 2018
League and League Cup: 2
2014, 2019
Cup Doubles: 5
1941–42 (FAI Cup and Dublin and Belfast Inter-City Cup)
1948–49 (FAI Cup and Dublin City Cup)
1976–77 (FAI Cup and Leinster Senior Cup
1977–78 (League of Ireland Cup and Leinster Senior Cup)
1980–81 (FAI Cup and League Cup)

Team and individual awards
FIFA Puskás Award (nomination): 1
2020 (Jordan Flores)
RTÉ Sports Team of the Year Award (all sports): 1
2015
Philips Sports Manager of the Year (all sports): 1
2016 (Stephen Kenny)
SWAI Personality of the Year: 9
1979 (Jim McLaughlin), 1982 (Tommy McConville), 1988 (Terry Eviston), 1991 (Peter Hanrahan), 2014 (Stephen Kenny), 2015 (Richie Towell), 2016 (Stephen Kenny), 2018 (Stephen Kenny), 2019 (Vinny Perth)
SWAI Goalkeeper of the Year: 2
2015 (Gary Rogers), 2019 (Gary Rogers)
PFAI Players' Player of the Year: 3
2015 (Richie Towell), 2016 (Daryl Horgan), 2018 (Michael Duffy)
PFAI Players' Young Player of the Year: 5
1990 (Tony Cousins), 1993 (Richie Purdy), 2013 (Richie Towell), 2014 (Daryl Horgan), 2018 (Jamie McGrath)
PFAI Players' First Division Player of the Year: 2
2006 (Philip Hughes), 2008 (David Cassidy)
PFAI Players' Manager of the Year: 6
2013–16 (Stephen Kenny), 2018 (Stephen Kenny), 2019 (Vinny Perth)
FAI League of Ireland Player of the Year: 3
2015 (Richie Towell), 2016 (Daryl Horgan), 2018 (Chris Shields)
FAI Special Merit Award: 1
2016 (Dundalk)
Fair Play League: 3
2005 (First Division); 2014, 2016 (Premier Division)
League Top Scorer: 9
1928–29 (17, Eddie Carroll); 1963–64 (18, Jimmy Hasty); 1966–67 (18, Danny Hale); 1967–68 (15, Ben Hannigan); 1990–91 (18, Peter Hanrahan); 2014 (20, Patrick Hoban); 2015 (25, Richie Towell); 2018 (29, Patrick Hoban); 2020 (10, Patrick Hoban)
First Division Top Scorer: 1
2006 (21, Philip Hughes)

Player of the Month
The League of Ireland Player of the Month is selected by the Soccer Writers' Association of Ireland (SWAI).

European record

As of 12 August 2021.

Domestic records held by the club
Most Premier Division Titles: (8—joint record)
Most League and League Cup Doubles: (2—joint record)
Most consecutive top-two League finishes: (7, 2013–2019)
Most points in a League season: (87, in 2018)
Most matches played in European competition: (90, as of the end of the 2021 season)
Most ties won in a single European campaign: (3, in the 2020–21 UEFA Europa League)
Most points won in the group stage of a European season: (4, in the 2016–17 Europa League)
Most goals scored in a League season: (85, in 2018)
Most goals scored in an FAI Cup campaign: (22, in 2020)
Largest Goal Difference in a League season: (+65, in 2018)
Fewest defeats in a 30+ match League season: (1, 2015)
Most consecutive FAI Cup final appearances: (6—joint record, 2015–2020)
Record FAI Cup tie victory: (11–0 v Athlone Town, 2020)
Most goalscorers in a single match: (9, v Athlone Town, 2020)
Most 'Player of the Month' awards in a single season: (6, 2016, 2018)

Club records

Medal winning records – players

a. Includes the Top Four Cup, Leinster Senior Cup, Dublin and Belfast Intercity Cup, Champions Cup (All-Ireland), President of Ireland's Cup, and LFA President's Cup.

Honours – managers

Honours won during years when the club had a management committee and not a first team manager (1934–1965) not included

a. Includes the Dublin City Cup, Top Four Cup, First Division Championship, President of Ireland's Cup, Dublin and Belfast Intercity Cup, Champions Cup (All-Ireland), Leinster Senior Cup, and LFA President's Cup.

Appearance records
Competitive matches only, includes appearances as substitute. Years do not include breaks in service.

a. Includes the Top Four Cup, Leinster Senior Cup, Dublin and Belfast Intercity Cup, Setanta Sports Cup, Champions Cup (All-Ireland), President of Ireland's Cup, and LFA President's Cup.

Goalscoring records
Totals during club career. Years do not include breaks in service. Competitive matches only.

a. Includes the Top Four Cup, Leinster Senior Cup, Dublin and Belfast Intercity Cup, Setanta Sports Cup, Champions Cup (All-Ireland), President of Ireland's Cup, and LFA President's Cup.

Single season
All competitions: 43, Joe Sayers, 1935–36
League: 29, Patrick Hoban, 2018
FAI Cup: 8, David McMillan, 2020
League Cup: 6, Warren Patmore, 1994–95
Shield: 19, Joe Sayers, 1935–36
Dublin City Cup: 11, Peadar Walsh, 1948–49
European competition: 5, David McMillan, 2016–17

Single match
Shield: 5, Joe Sayers v Bohemians, 1935–36
Dublin City Cup: 5, Peadar Walsh v Waterford, 1947–48; Peadar Walsh v Waterford, 1948–49
FAI Cup: 4, Eddie Carroll v Bray Unknowns, 1928–29
League Cup: 4, Warren Patmore v Longford Town, 1994–95; Patrick Hoban v Bohemians, 2019

Match records
Highest Home attendance:
30,417 v Legia Warsaw, 2016 (Aviva Stadium, Dublin).
18,000 v Tottenham Hotspur, 1981 (Oriel Park, Dundalk).
Record victory:
11–0 v Athlone Town, 2020 FAI Cup (away)
Record League victory:
9–0 v Jacobs, 1932 (home)
9–0 v Shelbourne, 1980 (home)
Record League defeat:
1–9 v Limerick, 1944 (away)
Record European victory:
4–0 v Fram, 1981 (home)
4–0 v Newtown, 2021 (home)
Record European defeat:
0-10 v Liverpool, 1969 (away)
Most points in a League season:
87 in 36 games (2.42 per game), 2018
Best offensive League season:
64 goals scored in 22 games (2.91 per game), 1930–31
85 goals scored in 36 games (2.36 per game), 2018
Best defensive League season:
13 goals conceded in 30 games (0.43 per game), 1979–80
Biggest Goal Difference in a League season: 
+65, 2018
Record League sequences:
Consecutive wins: 13, 2018
Consecutive losses: 11, 1998–99 (last eight games) and 1999–00 (first three games)
Consecutive draws: 10, 2005
Longest undefeated run: 24 games, 2019
Longest run of clean sheets: 8 games, 2018
Longest run without a win: 19 games, 2002–03 (10 games) through 2003 (nine games)

Club milestones
Landmark firsts
12 December 1903: Dundalk G.N.R. A.F.C. first recorded match (v Dundalk Wanderers, Fairgreen Dundalk)
10 February 1906: First match in Dundalk and District League (v St. Nicholas's, Polo Field, Dundalk)
6 September 1919: First match for re-constituted Dundalk G.N.R. – in Newry and District League (v Newry United)
7 October 1922: First match in Leinster Senior League (away v Inchicore United)
21 August 1926: First match in Free State League (away v Fordsons)
21 August 1926: First goal in Free State League (Joey Quinn v Fordsons)
19 September 1926: First win in Free State League (home v Jacobs)
20 April 1929: First Dundalk player capped for Ireland (Bob Egan v Belgium, Dalymount Park)
18 April 1931: First FAI Cup Final (v Shamrock Rovers, Dalymount Park)
9 September 1931: First Trophy (President's Cup v Shamrock Rovers, Dalymount Park)
23 August 1936: First match in Oriel Park (v Cork F.C.)
26 April 1942: First FAI Cup Final win (v Cork United, Dalymount Park)
26 December 1950: First Leinster Senior Cup Final win (v St Patrick's Athletic, Dalymount Park)
11 September 1963: First match in Europe (v FC Zurich in Dalymount Park)
25 September 1963: First victory in Europe (away v FC Zurich)
20 September 1967: First European match, and first match under lights in Oriel Park (v Vasas SC)
12 April 1978: First League Cup Final win (v Cork Alberts, Flower Lodge)
22 April 1979: First League & Cup Double
15 August 1999: First match in League of Ireland First Division
25 August 2005: First match on artificial surface in Oriel Park (v Drogheda United FAI Cup)
15 September 2016: First match in group stage of European competition (away v AZ Alkmaar)
Landmark matches & goals
27 September 1931: 100th League match (away v Cork F.C.)
27 December 1937: 100th League victory (v Drumcondra)
9 March 1952: 1000th goal scored in League of Ireland (Paddy Mullen v Waterford)
29 March 1953: 500th match in League of Ireland (home v Waterford)
2 February 1975: 1,000th match in League of Ireland (away v Cork Celtic)
2 January 1977: 2,000th goal scored in League of Ireland (Jackie McManus v Sligo Rovers)
11 January 1981: 500th League victory (v Thurles Town)
5 April 1992: 1,500th match in League of Ireland (home v Shelbourne)
18 September 2001: 3,000th goal scored in top flight of League of Ireland (Ger Robinson v Bohemians)
8 March 2007: 2,000th match in League of Ireland (v Finn Harps)
8 March 2007: 100th victory in League of Ireland First Division (v Finn Harps)
22 July 2015: 50th match in European competition (home v BATE Borisov)
9 April 2016: 1,000th goal scored in League of Ireland Premier Division (Brian Gartland v Longford Town)
(as of the end of the 2022 season Dundalk have played 2,228 matches, won 1,009 and scored 3,825 goals in the top-flight of the League of Ireland)

Sources

Internationals
Dundalk Football Club players capped for Republic of Ireland while at the club

Players receiving full international caps for other countries while at the club

Players receiving full international caps after leaving the club

Footnotes

References
Bibliography

Citations